Servan is a village in Iran.

Servan may also refer to
Saint-Servan, a town in western France
Arroyo de San Serván, a municipality in Spain
Servan-Schreiber, a surname 
Joseph Michel Antoine Servan (1737–1807), French publicist and lawyer
Joseph Marie Servan de Gerbey (1741–1808), French general
Pierre-Servan-René Bouvet (1750–1795), French naval officer